An open-source car is a car with open design: designed as open-source hardware, using open-source principles.

Automobiles 

Open-source cars include:

Completed and available to build, with link to CAD files and build instructions:

 LifeTrac tractor from Open Source Ecology has build instructions for most revisions

Concept stage:

 Rally Fighter, an all-terrain vehicle by Local Motors uses a design released under a CC-BY-NC-SA license
 SGT01 from Wikispeed
 OScar: started in 1999, still in concept phase as of 2013.
 OSVehicle Tabby: Tabby is the first OSVehicle: an industrializable, production ready, versatile, universal chassis.
 Riversimple Urban Car: The CAD models for the Riversimple Hyrban technology demonstrator have been released under a CC-BY-NC-SA
 Common, Dutch electric car (2009)
 eCorolla, an electric vehicle conversion

 FOSSHW Category L7e Hybrid EV
 Luka EV, an electric car production platform which first car is the Luka EV. Only Mrk I & II are open source, the source was closed in July 2016 to allow commercial production of Mrk III
 Google Community Vehicle, a multi-purpose mode of transport. It can be used as a farm vehicle that attaches to farming equipment or as a means to transport the produce. This car was create by an Indian team for the 2016 Michelin Challenge Design, "Mobility for All International Design Competition"

Self-driving car prototypes have collected petabytes of data. Some companies, including Daimler, Baidu, Aptiv, Lyft, Waymo, Argo AI, Ford and Audi have publicly released datasets under more-or-less open licenses.

Other open-source vehicles 
Many open-source vehicles come in the form of velomobiles, like the PUUNK, the Hypertrike, the evovelo mö or the Atomic Duck velomobile.

Other open-source vehicles include the Xtracycle.

See also 
 Kit car
 Modular design
 Velomobile

References 

Open hardware vehicles
Open design